Cathexis vitticollis is a species of beetle in the family Cerambycidae. It was described by Zajciw in 1967. It is known from Brazil.

References

Colobotheini
Beetles described in 1967